Cala Hohepa (born 27 July 1985) is a New Zealand rugby union player who plays as a wing for New Zealand, Otago Spirit and Alhambra Union.

Life
On 16 October 2007 she made her international debut with New Zealand at Cooks Gardens in Whanganui  scoring two tries against Australia and proved herself to be an emerging player with another three tries in the second win over the Wallaroos a few days after (29-12 at Trust Porirua Park near Wellington).

Hohepa was included in the squad for the 2010 World Cup and became one of the stars of the tournament with her pace, skill-set and vision resulting in seven tries (including a hat-trick in the opening match and some other tries against England, France and Australia).

Since 2011 she has been in Japan with her partner Karne Hesketh, a professional rugby player who plays wing for Fukuoka Sanix Blues. She was named in the squad for the 2017 Women's Rugby World Cup and was part of the winning team of the 2019 Women's Rugby Super Series.

In 2022 Hohepa was initially named in the Black Ferns squad for the Pacific Four Series but was ruled out due to injury.

References

External links
 Carla Hohepa at Black Ferns
 

1985 births
Living people
New Zealand female rugby union players
New Zealand women's international rugby union players
New Zealand female rugby sevens players
New Zealand women's international rugby sevens players
Otago rugby union players
People from Te Awamutu
Otago Polytechnic alumni
Rugby union players from Waikato
People educated at Te Awamutu College